In mathematics, in the theory of modules, the radical of a module is a component in the theory of structure and classification.  It is a generalization of the Jacobson radical for rings.  In many ways, it is the dual notion to that of the socle soc(M) of M.

Definition
Let R be a ring and M a left R-module.  A submodule N of M is called maximal or cosimple if the quotient M/N is a simple module.  The radical of the module M is the intersection of all maximal submodules of M,

Equivalently,

These definitions have direct dual analogues for soc(M).

Properties
 In addition to the fact rad(M) is the sum of superfluous submodules, in a Noetherian module rad(M) itself is a superfluous submodule.
 A ring for which rad(M) = {0} for every right R-module M is called a right V-ring. 
 For any module M, rad(M/rad(M)) is zero.
 M is a finitely generated module if and only if the cosocle M/rad(M) is finitely generated and rad(M) is a superfluous submodule of M.

See also
Socle (mathematics)
Jacobson radical

References
 
 

Module theory